Cyanea marksii, or Marks' cyanea, is a tree in the bellflower family. It is critically endangered. Some think that it is extinct.

Distribution 
It is  native to North America and was found on Hawaii.

Taxonomy 
It was named by Joseph Rock in  Occas. Pap. Bernice Pauahi Bishop Mus. 22: 52 in 1957.

References

External links 

marksii
Endemic flora of Hawaii